Chah Sangari (also Romanized as Chāh Sangarī) is a village in Golestan Rural District, in the Central District of Sirjan County, Kerman Province, Iran. At the 2006 census, its population was 116, in 24 families.

References 

Populated places in Sirjan County